Limu, otherwise known as rimu or imu (from Proto-Austronesian *limut) is a general Polynesian term for edible plants living underwater, such as seaweed, or plants living near water, like algae. In Hawaii, there are approximately one hundred names for kinds of limu, sixty of which can be matched with scientific names.  Hundreds of species of marine algae were once found in Hawaii. Many limu are edible, and used in the cuisine throughout most of Polynesia.

Uses 
Several species of limu are used as food throughout Polynesia and is typically eaten raw as accompaniment to meals, usually fish. 

In Hawaii, limu was seen as a major component of the Hawaiian diet alongside fish and poi. Hawaiians cultivated several varieties of seaweed for food as well as to feed fish farmed within fish ponds. As many as 75 types of limu were used for food, more than the 35 used in Japanese cuisine, which is also well known for its use of seaweed. In modern times, limu is often used as a condiment, typically in raw fish dishes such as poke.

Limu was used in hoʻoponopono, the ancient Hawaiian process of conflict resolution. Injured and accused parties gathered to pray, seek forgiveness and eat  leaves as a symbol of reconciliation. It is also used in traditional hula attire and as medicine.

Due to the shape of its foliage, the Maori also applied the name  to the native tree Dacrydium cupressinum.

Types 
Limu comes from multiple genera

Easter Island 
 (Dictyopteris australis)
 (Sargassum obtusifolium)

French Polynesia 
Konini (Caulerpa racemosa) (Rapa Iti)
 (Caulerpa racemosa) (Tahiti)
 (Ulva lactuca) (Tahiti)

Hawaii 
  (Ulva prolifera)
  (Sargassum aquifolium) – employed during .
  – "dry or hard"
  (Asparagopsis taxiformis) – most popular
  (Grateloupia filicina or "pubic hair") – favorite of Liliʻuokalani.
  (Hypnea sp.)
  (Dictyopteris plagiogramma) – once found in almost continuous beds around O‘ahu. Disappeared from Waikiki Beach in the 1960s, crowded out by pollution and the invasive Gracilaria salicornia.
  (Gymnogongrus long or slender) 
  (Gracilaria coronopifolia,  [Japanese]) – cooked with meats to form a savory jelly. Later diced raw with poke, mixed with chili and salt.
  (Ulva lactuca) – used in hula
  (genus Codium, species Codium edule)
  (Ulva lactuca and Monostroma oxyspermum) – named after a shark god who was swaddled in its silken leaves.
  – shawl of the goddess Hina. Shares its name with a native butterfly and a family of nudibranchs.

New Zealand 
  (Gracilaria chilensis)
  (Pyropia sp.)
  (Zostera sp.)
  (Gigartina sp.)
  (Durvillaea antarctica)
  (Caulerpa brownii)
  (Polysiphonia sp.)
  (Sargassum sp.)
  (Caulerpa racemosa)
  (Hydroclathrus sp.)
  (Turbinaria sp.)

Niue 
 (Caulerpa racemosa)
 (Caulerpa cupressoides)

Samoa 
  (Halymenia sp.)
  (Caulerpa racemosa)
  (Gracilaria sp.)
  (Turbinaria sp.)
  (Sargassum sp.)

Tonga 
  (Caulerpa peltata)
  (Caulerpa serrulata/Caulerpa cupressoides)
  (Hypnea charoides)
  (Caulerpa sertularoides)
  (Caulerpa scalpeliformis)
  (Cladosiphon sp.)
  (Caulerpa racemosa)

Threats
Limu has become increasingly difficult to find because of over-picking, pollution, and urban development, especially construction in watersheds. Many important kinds of limu grow best in brackish water where fresh water empties into the sea. Another threat to limu is the spread of marine alien invasive species, such as members of the genus  Kappaphycus (smothering seaweed), Gracilaria salicornia (gorilla ogo), Avrainvillea amadelpha (leather mudweed), Hypnea musciformis (hook weed) and Acanthophora spicifera (prickly seaweed).

See also
List of Hawaiian dishes
Oceanic cuisine

Further reading

References

External links 

 

Edible seaweeds
Hawaiian cuisine
Niuean cuisine
Samoan cuisine
Tokelauan cuisine
Tongan cuisine
Tuvaluan cuisine
Wallis and Futuna cuisine
Algae of Hawaii
Polynesian cuisine
Oceanian cuisine